KDHU-LD is a low-power television station in the Houston area, owned by Daystar. It broadcasts in digital on VHF channel 7, displaying channel 50 to tuners via PSIP.

History 
The station was originally licensed to Louise, Texas as K50HN on analog channel 50 in 2003, with a transmitter on County Road 404 east of El Campo, Texas. It is unknown when the station actually went on the air, but it went silent on December 4, 2006, due to transmitter failure.

The station's call sign was changed to KDHU-LP on June 23, 2006.

As part of the digital transition, Daystar applied to move the station's signal to channel 7 on a tower at the Missouri City antenna farm, and the old channel 50 permit was cancelled.

The station's channel 7 license was granted December 27, 2010.

It is currently broadcasting a direct feed from the Daystar network, as opposed to rebroadcasting co-owned KLTJ which aired some locally produced programs, til they dropped to become a direct feed affiliate.

Its low (300 watt) power and VHF band placement make the station difficult to receive in most parts of the Houston area. The station has filed to increase its power to 3 kW.

References

External links 
 

Television stations in Texas
Low-power television stations in the United States